Per Kleiva  (1 April 1931 – 17 September 2017) was a Norwegian painter and graphic artist.

Biography
He was born in Torsken to schoolteacher Ivar Kleiva (1903–98) and Frida Pettersen (1905–63). He was married to Ida Drage.
He grew up in Troms, Sunnmøre and Gulen in Sogn. He took courses at Bergen Academy of Art and Design. In 1959 he studied under Niels Lergaard at the Royal Danish Academy of Fine Arts in Copenhagen, and he also studied at the Academy of Fine Arts in Florence and the Royal Swedish Academy of Fine Arts in Stockholm.  Kleiva studied under Per Krohg at the Norwegian National Academy of Fine Arts in the years 1955 to 1957.

From 1961 to 1965 he was an assistant to  visual artist Sigurd Winge (1909–1970). 
He made his debut at the  Autumn Exhibition  at Oslo in 1963. From 1987 to 1993 he was appointed professor at the Norwegian National Academy of Fine Arts.

His works are represented in the National Museum of Art, Architecture and Design, the Henie Onstad Art Center and the
Nordnorsk Kunstmuseum.

References

Other sources
 Renberg, Ulf (1986)  Per Kleiva (Oslo: Labyrinth Press)  

1931 births
2017 deaths
People from Torsken
20th-century Norwegian painters
21st-century Norwegian painters
Norwegian male painters
20th-century Norwegian male artists
21st-century Norwegian male artists